Chamblee is a city in northern DeKalb County, Georgia, United States, northeast of Atlanta. The population was 30,164 as of the 2020 census.

History
The area that would later become Chamblee was originally dairy farms. During the late nineteenth century, an intersection of two railroads was constructed in Chamblee; one carried passengers from Atlanta to Charlotte, North Carolina, while the other ferried workers and goods back and forth from a factory in Roswell to Atlanta. A settlement known as Roswell Junction emerged at the intersection, and the United States Postal Service decided to establish a post office there.  However, feeling the name of the settlement was too similar to nearby Roswell, they randomly selected Chamblee from a list of petitioners for the new post office name. Chamblee was incorporated in 1907.

During World War I and World War II, Chamblee served as the site of U.S. military operations. During World War I, the U.S. operated Camp Gordon, home to 40,000 servicemen. This influx of new people created a building boom in the town. Camp Gordon was closed after the war and then re-opened as Navy Flight Training Center at the advent of World War II.

Immediately after World War II, Chamblee experienced growth in blue-collar industry and residents due to its proximity to the newly opened General Motors plant in neighboring Doraville. Manufacturing plants also located along the newly constructed Peachtree Industrial Boulevard. By the 1980s, much of the city's industrial base had downsized or eroded; in its place sprang up multi-ethnic businesses that catered to the immigrants and refugees moving to Chamblee and Doraville en masse due to the cities' affordable housing. By the time of the 1996 Summer Olympics, Chamblee had emerged as a multi-cultural city inhabited by a large immigrant community.

During the first decade of the 2000s, the city grew as it refined its image, constructing a new city hall in 2002. In 2010, Chamblee annexed an area directly to the northwest that includes Huntley Hills and a resident population of approximately 5,000.  It also renamed Peachtree Industrial Boulevard to Peachtree Boulevard, and took steps to revitalize its downtown. In 2012 the city had an annexation proposal that was voted down by a small margin. In November 2013 the city had another annexation proposal that was passed by voters.  Following the annexation, the city and neighboring Brookhaven had a dispute in 2014 over which city would annex the Century Center development. The courts gave Century Center to Chamblee.

According to 2020 Census data, Chamblee effectively tripled its population since 2010. It started the decade with roughly 9,800 residents and ended it with more than 30,000, mostly due to two annexations. The only city to gain more residents in that time was Atlanta, and only two Georgia cities — Morgan and Pendergrass — grew at faster rates in the 2010s.City leaders have credited Chamblee’s location as a transportation hub, with close proximity to two interstates, a MARTA station and the Peachtree-DeKalb Airport, as a key reason for the city’s growth. In the early 2020s Chamblee attracted multiple mixed-use developments and office projects.

Geography
Chamblee is south of Dunwoody, southwest of Doraville, northeast of Brookhaven, and north of Interstate 85. The city is located at  (33.887552, -84.305326).

Transportation

Major roads and expressways

Mass transit
GRTA Xpress / RTA commuter buses and MARTA heavy rail subway and buses serve the county.
 Chamblee (MARTA station)

Pedestrians and cycling
The Chamblee Rail Trail is situated in Chamblee. It offers a short but useful paved pathway through downtown, passing under busy Peachtree Boulevard.

At its northern end, sits the city’s largest park, Keswick Park, and just two blocks from the trail's southern end is the Chamblee MARTA Station off Peachtree Road. Natural landscaping and trees keep the route pleasant, while many businesses and restaurants are just steps away.

Work is underway to extend the trail along the former Roswell Railroad spur, bringing the pathway east to Pierce Drive, with long-term plans in the works to link the pathway into the rapidly-developing regional trail network and the Atlanta Beltline. Currently, there are plans for the construction of a multi-use trail, known as the Peachtree Creek Greenway. The goal of the greenway is to provide residents with close-to-home and close-to-work access to bicycle and pedestrian trails, serve transportation and recreation needs, and help encourage quality of life and sustainable economic growth. The trail will connect the cities of Atlanta, Brookhaven, Chamblee and Doraville.

Demographics

2020 census

As of the 2020 United States census, there were 30,164 people, 11,526 households, and 5,488 families residing in the city.  The racial and ethnic composition of population was 31.23% white. 13.36% Black or African American, .19% Native American, 8.62% Asian or Pacific Islander,  3.13% with one or more races unidentified.  43.48% of Chamblee residents are Hispanic or Latino. 

From 2010 to 2020, the population inside Chamblee had tripled. Influx into Chamblee was spread among identified ethnic groups.  More Asian and African-American people moved into Chamblee compared to the other races.

2010 census
As of the 2010 Census Chamblee had a population of 9,892.  The racial and ethnic composition of the population was 45.0% white (19.0% non-Hispanic white), 7.0% black or African American (6.2% non-Hispanic black), 2.1% Native American (0.2% non-Hispanic Native American), 8.0% Asian (1.8% Vietnamese, 1.6% Asian Indian, 4.6% other Asian), 33.5% from some other race (0.2% non-Hispanic from some other race) and 4.1% reporting two or more races. 58.5% of the population was Hispanic or Latino of any race.

2000 census
As of the census of 2000, there were 9,552 people, 2,673 households, and 1,849 families residing in the city. The racial makeup of the city was 45.36% White, 3.71% African American, 0.91% Native American, 13.98% Asian, 0.32% Pacific Islander, 31.45% from other races, and 4.27% from two or more races. Hispanic or Latino of any race were 56.37% of the population.

There were 2,673 households, out of which 33.9% had children under the age of 18 living with them, 46.4% were married couples living together, 9.0% had a female householder with no husband present, and 30.8% were non-families. 15.8% of all households were made up of individuals, and 4.1% had someone living alone who was 65 years of age or older.  The average household size was 3.57 and the average family size was 3.65.

In the city, the population was spread out, with 23.2% under the age of 18, 17.9% from 18 to 24, 41.0% from 25 to 44, 12.8% from 45 to 64, and 5.0% who were 65 years of age or older.  The median age was 28 years. For every 100 females, there were 161.3 males.  For every 100 females age 18 and over, there were 176.9 males.

The median income for a household in the city was $45,992. Males had a median income of $22,024 versus $22,368 for females. The per capita income for the city was $15,492.  About 15.8% of families and 22.9% of the population were below the poverty line, including 25.2% of those under age 18 and 7.8% of those age 65 or over.  In addition, 16.7% of families reported a household income higher than $100,000.

Neighborhoods

Downtown: Downtown Chamblee has been preserved has an early 20th-century railroad community. Many of the buildings are of historic vintage, and the district has architectural similarities to other similar former railroad communities, such as Decatur and Norcross. Much of the downtown businesses are devoted to Chamblee's antique industry, but that has been changing. The district has attracted significant commercial development since 2000, including lofts and townhomes. The Chamblee MARTA Station and City Hall are both located downtown. Massive economic development including the Town Center Initiative and downtown revitalization projects, have turned Downtown Chamblee into a mecca for foodies.  A recently opened brewery and distillery flank downtown Chamblee.  A new Chamblee signature event called, Taste of Chamblee, debuted in the mid 20 Teens, showcases the food of the Chamblee area.
Buford Highway Corridor: The Buford Highway community is home to one of the highest concentration of foreign-born residents in the country, including Mexican, Central American, Chinese, Korean and Vietnamese. The area attracted many Latino workers during the construction boom that preceded the 1996 Olympic Games. Asian business owners were attracted to the stretch of highway by cheap leases and reliable traffic flow.  The more than 1,000 immigrant-owned businesses are owned by and patronized by a wide variety of ethnic groups, including Korean, Mexican, Chinese, and Vietnamese, and Indian, Bangladeshi, Central American, Somali, and Ethiopian. The DeKalb County Chamber of Commerce calls the area the "International Corridor."
Peachtree-Dekalb Airport - Peachtree Dekalb Airport is the third-largest payer of property taxes in DeKalb County, responsible for an estimated 7,300 jobs, and generates approximately $130 million in income for local residents. PDK, as the airport is commonly called (each public-use airport has an official Department of Transportation code of letters and/or numbers), has averaged 230,000 operations-takeoffs and landings-annually for more than thirty years. PDK is the second-busiest airport in Georgia, behind only Hartsfield-Jackson.  A multitude of private and public airlines/pilots fly out of PDK every day. PDK's economic development, the Globe, is home to small businesses invested in the airline trade. PDK neighborhood is also home to two of the most iconic restaurants in Chamblee, The Downwind, located the end of Airport Road facing the runway, and the 57th Fighter Group Restaurant, a World WarII military themed restaurant owned by aviation entrepreneur, Pat Epps 
Sexton Woods: Partially in Chamblee and partially in neighboring city Brookhaven, Sexton Woods is mixed neighborhood of 1950's ranch style homes and more recently new craftsman style infill housing.  Sexton Woods is bordered by Chamblee-Dunwoody Road, Harts Mill Road, and Ashford Dunwoody Road. Sexton Woods is also the home of Chamblee Middle School, located on Chamblee-Dunwoody Road until 2006.
Keswick Village: Adjacent to Sexton Woods, Keswick Village, originally built in 1950, is a quaint neighborhood of renovated original homes and craftsman style infill housing.  It is adjacent to Keswick Park, the second largest park in the city.
Clairmont Park: Residential neighborhoods along Clairmont Road, south of Peachtree Boulevard, near Peachtree Dekalb Airport.
Huntley Hills: Huntley Hills is a neighborhood established in the early 1960s, though the first house was built on Plantation Lane in 1950. Huntley Hills Elementary School is located in the middle of the neighborhood. Huntley Hills Elementary has a Montessori program added during the 2000–2001 school year and was opened on August 21, 1964. Huntley hills also has a wide range of special needs programs for children ranging from high to low disorders.
Beverly Hills/Beverly Woods: Beverly Hills/Beverly Woods is a neighborhood established in the early 1950s in a portion of Chamblee that annexed into the city in 2013.  Many houses in this area were built as housing for the Doraville GM plant employees that worked nearby.  This neighborhood borders Chamblee-Tucker Road,  Shallowford Road,  and Beverly Hills Drive.  Mostly Mid Century ranch style and split level houses with minimal infill housing as of 2017.

Past Names for City NeighborhoodsAtlanta Chinatown

According to Biz Journal, the Atlanta metropolitan area is home to an "... estimated 50,000 Chinese-Americans...."  This suburb of Atlanta, Georgia is home to a Chinatown that was built in 1988, and is one of the first of the "New Chinatowns" according to the World Journal.  Although the city of Atlanta itself does not have a "Chinatown", Chamblee's Chinatown mall is referred to as "Atlanta Chinatown."  The neighborhood is part of the Buford Highway international market area and is located near the Chamblee MARTA station and New Peachtree Road.  According to the Atlanta Journal-Constitution (AJC), refers to this "Chinatown Mall" as "... Atlanta's place for Chinese culture."  According to the official website, "Atlanta Chinatown" is located at 5379 New Peachtree Road.  According to the Huffington Post, this Chinatown is an example of a "modern Chinatown", with Albany, Las Vegas, Dallas-Richardson, and North Miami Beach, Florida referenced as similar examples, with regard to the quality of Chinese food.  There is an annual Chinese New Year event that is held to celebrate the festival.  The author further states that Atlanta's Chinatown is "... unlike many older cities" which exists in an urban setting.  Atlanta's Chinatown according to her is "... in a strip mall" setting.  Bonnie Tsui further states in her book that the new Chinatowns rely on the Chinatown being built before the Chinese population comes, as she quoted about Las Vegas' Chinatown.

The Atlanta Chinatown market opened on August 8, 1988, and was further expanded in 1996 with an influx of new immigrants from Beijing.  
  According to the previous source, Atlanta's Chinatown has bakeries, restaurants, cosmetics, bookstores, a newspaper office, and many other Chinese-oriented stores.  The Chinatown is currently managed by Rochelle Anthony, who is an African American.

According to Biz Journal, Atlanta Chinatown was completely redone in the year 2000 by developer Peter Chang, who purchased the old "Chinatown Square Mall".  The plans call for "...the 65,000-square-foot mall [to include] a Chinese food court which contains 7 vendors, two dine-in restaurants, several offices, a Dinho Supermarket, gift shops, a bookstore, jewelers, a video rental store, a beauty salon and other retailers. It will be part of the International Village project, a 375-acre live and work community with a global theme that is being developed by local business leaders, the DeKalb Chamber of Commerce, DeKalb County and the city of Chamblee."  According to this article, the plans are to make Atlanta Chinatown a tourist destination rather than it just being another shopping mall.

Government and infrastructure

The City of Chamblee operates under a mayor and council-city manager form of government. The Chamblee City Council is composed of a mayor and five council members. The City is divided into four council districts and one at-large district. One council member is elected from each of the four districts and one council member is elected from the city at large. The council members who are elected for the four districts must live in the district that they represent but all five council members are elected by a city-wide vote.

The Council enacts ordinances, establishes policy, adopts the annual budget, and establishes the ad valorem tax rate for each year. The City Manager is responsible for implementing the policies set forth by the Council, overseeing all City employees, and managing the day-to-day operations of the City.

2023:  

City Manager: Jon Walker

Mayor: Brian Mock

Council Members:  Elmer Veith, Jimmy Furst, John Mesa, Paul Stovall

Mayor Pro Tem and Council Member:  Leslie C. Robson

Education

Primary and secondary schools

Public schools
The DeKalb County School System serves Chamblee.

Elementary
 Huntley Hills Elementary School, a public Montessori school (Chamblee)
 Dresden Elementary School (Chamblee)
 Ashford Park Elementary School (Brookhaven)
 Montclair Elementary School (Brookhaven)
 Montgomery Elementary School (Brookhaven)
Kittredge Magnet School for High Achievers is in Brookhaven.

Middle schools
 Chamblee Middle School
 Sequoyah Middle School (Doraville, serves a section of southern Chamblee)

High schools
 Chamblee Charter High School
 Cross Keys High School (Brookhaven, serves a section of southern Chamblee)
Henderson High School served residents of Chamblee until closed in mid-1990s.

Private schools
St. Pius X High School

In the 2005–2006 school year the administration of Sophia Academy, previously in Sandy Springs, sought to establish a new campus and did a capital campaign. Construction began circa 2007. The new campus, in DeKalb County, was annexed into Chamblee. Sophia merged into Notre Dame Academy in Duluth, Georgia effective August 2017.

Post-secondary 
Interactive College of Technology

Public libraries
DeKalb County Public Library operates the Chamblee Branch. Embry Hills Library is located in Chamblee.

Tourism, Hospitality, and Development 
Buford Highway (also Buford Highway Corridor, DeKalb International Corridor, and in the 1990-2000's as the DeKalb County International Village district), is a community northeast of the city of Atlanta, celebrated for its ethnic diversity and spanning multiple counties including Fulton, DeKalb, and Gwinnett counties in the U.S. state of Georgia. The area generally spans along and on either side of a stretch of Georgia State Route 13 (SR 13) in DeKalb County. It begins just north of Midtown Atlanta, continues northeast through the towns of Brookhaven, Chamblee, Doraville, and Norcross.  Most properties along the corridor are in the form of strip malls, retail businesses surrounded by large parking lots, and large apartment complexes. The largest strip malls are the Northeast Plaza, Plaza Fiesta and the Buford Highway Farmers Market complex.

Twin towns – sister cities

Chamblee is twinned with:

 Kovel, Ukraine

References

External links
 
City of Chamblee official website Portal style website, Government, Business, Library, Recreation and more
Official Income Data for Chamblee as reported by the 2000 US Govt. Census

 
Cities in Georgia (U.S. state)
Cities in DeKalb County, Georgia
Cities in the Atlanta metropolitan area